The Women's Downhill in the 2020 FIS Alpine Skiing World Cup involved 8 events, with only one canceled. 

Swiss skier Corinne Suter clinched the discipline title for 2020 after the eighth race, with just the finals to be completed. Thus, when the finals, scheduled for Wednesday, 18 March in Cortina d'Ampezzo, Italy, were cancelled due to the COVID-19 pandemic in Italy, downhill was the only women's discipline championship not affected.

Standings

DNF = Did Not Finish
DNS = Did Not Start

See also
 2020 Alpine Skiing World Cup – Women's summary rankings
 2020 Alpine Skiing World Cup – Women's Overall
 2020 Alpine Skiing World Cup – Women's Super-G
 2020 Alpine Skiing World Cup – Women's Giant Slalom
 2020 Alpine Skiing World Cup – Women's Slalom
 2020 Alpine Skiing World Cup – Women's Combined
 2020 Alpine Skiing World Cup – Women's Parallel
 World Cup scoring system

References

External links
 

Women's Downhill
FIS Alpine Ski World Cup women's downhill discipline titles